Akinpelu is a given name. Notable people with the name include:

Akinpelu Johnson (born 1965), Anglican bishop in Nigeria
Akinpelu Obisesan (1889–1963), Nigerian diarist, businessman, and politician
Akinpelu Oludele Adesola (1927–2010), Nigerian professor of surgery and educational administrator